Polygonum patulum, called tree hogweed, is a species of flowering plant in the knotweed family. It is native to the Mediterranean region, eastern Europe, the Caucasus, Siberia, Central Asia, Mongolia, and the Province of Xinjiang in northwestern China. It has also become sparingly naturalized in scattered locations in Australia and North America.

Description
Flowers are green, pink, or white.

References

External links
line drawing, Flora of China Illustrations vol. 5, fig. 239, 3-4 
photo of herbarium specimen at Missouri Botanical Garden

patulum
Flora of Europe
Flora of temperate Asia
Plants described in 1808